Hwang Kyun-young is a South Korean team handball coach. He coaches the Japanese national team, and participated at the 2011 World Women's Handball Championship in Brazil.

References

Living people
South Korean handball coaches
Year of birth missing (living people)